Cashes Green Halt was opened on 22 January 1930 on what is now the Golden Valley Line between Stroud and Stonehouse. This line was opened in 1845 as the Cheltenham and Great Western Union Railway from Swindon to Gloucester and this was one of many small stations and halts built on this line for the local passenger service. This particular halt was built later than the rest and was built to serve the then new Cashes Green housing development west of Stroud in response to a public request.

Access to the up platform was via steps from the overbridge. These were later replaced with a Tarmac slope. (C1957) The down platform was accessed from a similar slope into the 'birdcage' (still extant - 2010) which runs parallel to the railway and then proceeds at right angles south down to Upper Church Road, Cainscross. Originally the 'birdcage' (so-called because it consists of metal railings on either side giving the pedestrian the impression that they are actually in a 'birdcage') ended in a foot crossing over the railway approximately 100 yards west of the halt. It was diverted and the crossing closed at about the time the halt was built.

Closure of the halt came in November 1964 following the withdrawal of local stopping passenger services on the line. No trace of the halt remains today.

Services
This halt was served by the Gloucester to Chalford local passenger services, known as the Chalford Auto.

References

Stroud District
Disused railway stations in Gloucestershire
Former Great Western Railway stations
Railway stations in Great Britain opened in 1930
Railway stations in Great Britain closed in 1964
Beeching closures in England
1930 establishments in England
1964 disestablishments in England